Beon-dong is a dong, neighbourhood of Gangbuk-gu in Seoul, South Korea.

See also 
Administrative divisions of South Korea

References

External links
Gangbuk-gu official website
Gangbuk-gu map at the Gangbuk-gu official website
 Beon 1-dong resident office website

Neighbourhoods of Gangbuk District